Yohan Gomez (born 25 September 1981) is a French former professional footballer who played as a defender.

Gomez began his professional football career with Olympique Lyon. However after only making a few appearances with the senior team, Gomez left for SC Bastia where he played for five seasons.

Honours
 Ligue 1: 2003–04

References

External links
 
 
 

1986 births
Living people
Footballers from Lyon
French footballers
Association football defenders
Ligue 1 players
Ligue 2 players
Olympique Lyonnais players
SC Bastia players
AS Cannes players
Vannes OC players
GOAL FC players